This page is a record of notable attacks by paramilitary organisations on Ulster Defence Regiment personnel during the Troubles resulting in two or more fatalities, or notable firsts:

1971
9 August - a patrol from 6 UDR's Strabane company came under fire from the Provisional IRA using a Thompson sub-machine gun at a checkpoint near Clady Bridge border crossing, County Tyrone. Private Winston Donnell was killed instantly.  He was the first UDR soldier to be killed in action.
8 December - the first Catholic UDR soldier to die, Private Sean Russell, is shot dead in his home in New Barnsley, Belfast by the IRA.

1972
4 March - Captain Marcus McCausland, formerly of D Coy 5 UDR is abducted and killed by the Official Irish Republican Army (OIRA).  He was the first UDR officer to be killed.
21 September - a member of C Coy, 4 UDR and his wife are shot dead by the Provisional IRA as they watched TV at home near Derrylin.

1974

10 April - Major George Saunderson (Brevet Lt Col), until the previous year second-in-command of 4 UDR, was killed in the kitchen of the school in Derrylin where he worked by gunmen who then crashed through a Garda checkpoint to escape into the Republic of Ireland.
2 May - attack at the Deanery base of C Coy, 6 UDR in Clogher.  Opening fire using mortars then continuing with small arms and rockets, the estimated 40-man IRA team  mounted a sustained attack lasting for 25 minutes against the small contingent in the base who reply with automatic rifle fire, supported by Ferret armoured personnel carriers from the 1 Royal Tank Regiment. During the attack, Private Eva Martin was hit by a rocket fragment and died shortly after.  She was the first woman UDR soldier to be killed. Sean O'Callaghan was later convicted of murder after confessing his participation in the assault.
28 October - a bomb attack at the joint 3 UDR and regular army barracks at Ballykinlar destroys the Sandes soldiers canteen on the base, killing two members of the Duke of Edinburgh's Royal Regiment.

1991

1 March - A mobile patrol from the 2nd Battalion was the subject of the first recorded use of the Mk12 horizontal mortar  Two soldiers were killed as a result of the attack.  The funeral of one of them, Private Paul Sutcliffe, an Englishman, was held in Barrowford, Lancashire - the only UDR funeral to be held outside Northern Ireland.  The second casualty, Private Roger Love, from Portadown died after three days.  His kidneys were donated to the NHS.
31 May - At 11:30 PM a driverless truck loaded with 2,000 lb (1,100 kg) of a new type of home made explosive was rolled down a hill at the rear of the barracks and crashed through the perimeter fence, coming to rest against a corner of the main building. Automatic fire was heard by witnesses just before the explosion. The blast left a deep crater and it could be heard over 30 miles away, as far as Dundalk. Three UDR soldiers – Paul Blakely (30), Robert Crozier (46), Sydney Hamilton (44) – were killed and ten were wounded. Four civilians were also wounded. The Provisional IRA claimed responsibility two days later.

1992 

 17 January - Two off-duty UDR soldiers, working in the rebuilt of a British Army barracks at Omagh were seriously wounded when a civilian van carrying them and 12 others back home was struck by an improvised explosive device at Teebane, a rural crossroads between Omagh and Cookstown in County Tyrone. Eight other workers, one of them a member of the Royal Irish Rangers, were killed in the blast.
 17 June - In one of the last attacks on the regiment as an operational unit, a bomb in central Belfast wounded five UDR soldiers and two RUC constables.

Sources
A Testimony to Courage - the Regimental History of the Ulster Defence Regiment 1969 - 1992, Major John Furniss Potter, Pen & Sword Books Ltd, 2001, 
The Ulster Defence Regiment - An Instrument of Peace?, Chris Ryder, Methuen 1991,

References

Ulster Defence Regiment
The Troubles (Northern Ireland)-related lists
Provisional Irish Republican Army actions
British Army in Operation Banner
Military actions and engagements during the Troubles (Northern Ireland)
British military personnel killed in The Troubles (Northern Ireland)